Back from the Klondike is a maze first printed in the New York Journal and Advertiser on April 24, 1898. In introducing the puzzle, creator Sam Loyd describes it as having been constructed to specifically foil Leonhard Euler's rule for solving any maze puzzle by working backwards from the end point.

The following are Sam Loyd's original instructions:

Solution 
Loyd's given solution to the puzzle, described by Martin Gardner as "sneaky", is to move southwest twice, northeast three times, southwest three times and end with what Loyd calls a "bold strike via S.E. to liberty!".

In 1976, two graduate students at the University of Washington wrote a Fortran program to solve the puzzle, and discovered hundreds of possible solutions, all of them eventually converging on a square which was part of Loyd's given solution. All of these routes also passed through a particular square which was not part of Loyd's solution, suggesting an artist's error in drawing the original puzzle. Changing this square from a "2" to a "1" results in a puzzle which only has a single solution.

References

External links 
 The Cyclopedia of Puzzles; Original puzzle from Sam Loyd's Cyclopedia of 5000 Puzzles, Tricks, and Conundrums (With Answers).

Puzzles